Xiandao may refer to:

Xiandao dialect, a dialect of Achang language from Yingjiang County, Yunnan, China
Xiandao (1032–1034), reign period of Emperor Jingzong of Western Xia